Nadine Kuniko Nakamura is an American politician and Democratic member of the Hawaii House of Representatives. She represents District 14, encompassing east and north Kaua`i, from Wailua to Haena. She won the seat after incumbent Democrat Derek Kawakami decided to run for a seat in the Kauai County Council. Nakamura won re-election in 2020 against Republican candidate Steve Monas, 76.2% to 23.8%.

Early life and education

Nakamura was born in Honolulu, the youngest of four children of Hiroyoshi and Mabel Maeda. In 1979, Nakamura graduated from Radford High School in Honolulu. Nakamura then attended the University of Southern California (USC) where she obtained a Bachelor of Science, Public Affairs and Urban Planning in 1983.

While at USC, Nakamura spent a semester in Washington D.C. where she worked as an intern at Neighborhood Reinvestment Corp. (now NeighborWorks America) which promotes reinvestment in communities by local financial institutions working cooperatively with residents and local government. She earned a Master of Urban and Regional Planning at the University of Hawai‘i at Manoa in 1987.  

Nakamura successfully ran for the Aliamanu/Salt Lake/Foster Village Neighborhood Board 18 in 1984.

State of Hawaiʻi House of Representatives 
In 2016, Nadine Nakamura was elected to the State of Hawaiʻi House of Representatives for District 14. She currently serves as Chair of the Housing Committee, and a member of the Judiciary and Transportation committees.

State of Hawaiʻi, Kaua‘i County 
From 2013 to 2016, Nadine Nakamura was the Managing Director for the County of Kaua‘i under Mayor Bernard P. Carvalho Jr.

In 2010 Nadine Nakamura was elected to the Kaua‘i County Council, where she served until 2013. Nakamura served as the Vice Chair of the council, Chair of the Planning Committee, and Vice Chair of the Finance and Economic Development Committee.

Business experience 
Nadine Nakamura founded NKN Project Planning, a planning consulting firm in 1992. While at NKN Project Planning, she was responsible for notable community endeavors, some of which include:

 Co-developed the Kaua'i Planning & Action Alliance, a Kaua‘i-based nonprofit that brings together diverse organizations for collaborative planning and action to achieve targeted community goals.
 Co-founded Hawai‘i HomeOwnership Center, which provides education, information and support to create successful first-time homeowners in Hawai‘i. By addressing barriers and increasing rates of home ownership, the HomeOwnership Center aims to build stronger families and communities throughout the state of Hawai‘i.
 Developed “Lāwa‘i Kai Special Subzone Master Plan and Management Plan” for the National Tropical Botanical Garden. The plan was awarded the Environment/Preservation Award, 2011 by the American Planning Association, Hawai`i Chapter.

Non-profit experience 
From 1991 to 1992, Nadine Nakamura was a Project Coordinator with Pacific Housing Assistance Corp. where she helped to develop special needs affordable housing for the elderly and individuals with mental and developmental disabilities.

From 1985 to 1987, Nakamura was a development coordinator with the Neighborhood Reinvestment Corp., which promotes reinvestment in urban, suburban and rural communities by local financial institutions working cooperatively with residents and local government.

Other government experience 
Nakamura was a planner with the City and County of Honolulu Department of Land Utilization (1989–1991) and a transportation planner with the Department of Transportation (1987–1989).

Nakamura was a planner/staff researcher with the Hawai’i Community Development Authority (1984–1985), a public entity created by the Hawai‘i State Legislature to establish community development plans in community development districts; determine community development programs; and cooperate with private enterprise and federal, state, and county governments to bring community development plans to fruition.

Community involvement 

 Board Member, Hawai’i Community Reinvestment Corporation, July 2005-August 2013
 Member, American Planning Association
 Chair, Kapa‘a Middle School Community Council, August 2008 – 2010
 Board Member, Kaua‘i Island Utility Cooperative Foundation, August 2007 – 2010
 Member, County of Kaua`i, Cost Control Commission, 2008-2010
 Vice Chair, Board Member, Hawai’i Tourism Authority, July 2002-June 2006
 Chair, Kapa`a Elementary School Community Council, August 2003 – 2008
 Member, Kaua`i Planning & Action Alliance, 2003-2010
 Member, Kaua`i Chamber of Commerce, 2005-2010
 Member, Kapa`a Elementary School PTSA, 2000-2010
 Member, Kapa`a Middle School PTSA, 2006-2010
 Parent Member, Kapa`a Elementary School, School Community Based Management Council, 2001-2005
 Member, Kapa`a Business Association, 2005 - 2006
 Vice Chair, State Housing and Community Development Corporation of Hawaiʻi, July 1999-June 2002
 Advisory Council, Kaua`i Workforce Investment Act Youth Council, 2001-2002
 Director, State Housing Finance and Development Corporation, July 1995-July 1998

References

21st-century American politicians
21st-century American women politicians
American women of Japanese descent in politics
Democratic Party members of the Hawaii House of Representatives
Hawaii politicians of Japanese descent
Living people
University of Hawaiʻi at Mānoa alumni
University of Southern California alumni
Year of birth missing (living people)